Oren Middlebrook (born January 23, 1953) is a former American football wide receiver. He played for the Philadelphia Eagles in 1978.

References

1953 births
Living people
American football wide receivers
Arkansas State Red Wolves football players
Philadelphia Eagles players